Yoon Tae-Il (born 19 November 1964) is a South Korean former handball player who competed in the 1988 Summer Olympics.

In 1988 he won the silver medal with the South Korean team. He played all six matches as goalkeeper.

He coaches the Kazakhstan women's national handball team and participated at the 2011 World Women's Handball Championship.

References

External links
Profile

1964 births
Living people
South Korean male handball players
Olympic handball players of South Korea
Handball players at the 1988 Summer Olympics
Olympic silver medalists for South Korea
Olympic medalists in handball
South Korean handball coaches
Asian Games medalists in handball
Handball players at the 1986 Asian Games
Medalists at the 1988 Summer Olympics
Asian Games gold medalists for South Korea
Medalists at the 1986 Asian Games
20th-century South Korean people